Asuravamsam (English: The Demon Lineage) is a 1997 Malayalam-language action drama film written by Ranjith and directed by Shaji Kailas, with cinematography by V. Manikandan. The film stars Manoj K. Jayan, Siddique, Biju Menon, Narendra Prasad, Sai Kumar, Priya Raman and Chippy.

Plot
Palayam Murukan is an underworld gangster ruling Palayam market in Kozhikode, who hails from an aristocratic family and enjoys a good academic background, but unknownigly gets into the crime world during his college days. He was expelled from his house by his sister after he was arrested for a murder. In alliance with Mayor Swamy and assisted by the muscle power of his trusted henchman Dosth Vishwan, Murukan becomes the most powerful person of the city. His activities include mediating land contracts, arranging hartals for political parties and murdering for a cause. 

On the personal side, he enjoys a deep rooted friendship with Dosth, and also sponsors his adopted sister on her medical studies and is loved by the people of Palayam market. Things take a turn when Murukan clashes with Swamy over a land contract. Murukan backs Moosa Settu while Swamy supports the syndicate of Hussain Haji and Thattel brothers: Mani and Bobby. Mayor arranges the murder of Moosa Settu. Nandita Menon, a young industrialist also joins with them against Murukan, though she is unaware of their motive. The syndicate manages to bring a new city commissioner for the city to tackle Murukan. 

Jayamohan, who is known for his aggressive and arrogant ways of tackling crime gets into a direct fight with Murukan, where he creates many problems in the Palayam market, and arrests each and every one belonging to Murukan's gang, thus making Murukan try for violent retaliations, but Jayamohan, who discovers the soft side of Murukan, decides to turn him into a law-abiding citizen. Swamy and his group gets upset by this move. Nandita Menon also makes a truce with Murukan. Swami kills Dosth, which causes Murukan again to take law into his hands, where he finishes the crime syndicate by killing Swamy, Hussein Haji and Thaletti Brothers.

Trivia

This was the second script by Ranjith for Shaji Kailas after Rudraksham.
This was also the first Malayalam film of cinematographer V. Manikandan. 
Kuthiravattam Pappu appears in a song.
This film was shot in just 27 days at a budget of 78 lakhs and was completely shot in and around Kozhikode.

Cast

Manoj K. Jayan as Palayam Murukan
Siddique as Dosth Viswanathan
Biju Menon as Commissioner Jayamohan IPS
Sai Kumar as Bobby
Narendra Prasad as Mayor Swami
Priya Raman as Nanditha Menon
Chippy
Rizabawa as Hussain Haji
 Ilavarasi as Gayathri
 C. I. Paul as Mani
 K. B. Ganesh Kumar
 Mamukkoya
 Augustine
 Maniyanpilla Raju as Circle Inspector
 Rajan P. Dev as Moosa Settu
 Madhupal as Moosa Settu's son
 Sadiq as Sub Inspector
 Ajith Kollam
 Bindu Panicker
 Kunjandi
 Valsala Menon
 Kozhikode Narayanan Nair
 Kollam Thulasi
 Lalithasree

External links 
 

1997 films
1990s Malayalam-language films
Films directed by Shaji Kailas
Films shot in Kozhikode
Films set in Kerala